Up and Crumbling is an EP released by the American alternative rock band Gin Blossoms on October 8, 1991. It was released after the Gin Blossoms signed with A&M Records and, while attempting to create a full-length album, ran into a creative drought during the recording sessions. According to the band's official website, the band recorded Up and Crumbling "on their own in hopes of rekindling the spark from Dusted that had been missing from the recent recordings." The songs from this EP were remastered and included on the 2002 deluxe edition of the band's breakthrough album, New Miserable Experience.

Track listing
"Mrs. Rita" (Jim Swafford, Jesse Valenzuela) – 4:25
"Allison Road" (Robin Wilson) – 3:18
"Angels Tonight" (Doug Hopkins) – 3:33
"Just South of Nowhere" (Valenzuela) – 3:26
"Keli Richards" (Hopkins, Bill Leen) – 3:04

References

Gin Blossoms EPs
1991 debut EPs
A&M Records EPs